TestFlight is an online service for over-the-air installation and testing of mobile applications, currently owned by Apple Inc and only offered to developers within the iOS Developer Program. Developers sign up with the service to distribute applications to internal or external beta testers, who can subsequently send feedback about the application to developers. The TestFlight SDK additionally allows developers to receive remote logs, crash reports and tester feedback.

TestFlight initially supported testing of Android and iOS applications, but since March 2014, Apple has retracted support for Android. As of 2015, applications must be published for TestFlight using Xcode, and testers must be invited using iTunes Connect. 

Developers can also send the TestFlight invitation codes to the testers through emails, or testers can avail of the invitation link through the public pages. Once the tester has the invitation link, it can be opened on an iPhone with the TestFlight app installed, and testers can directly install the beta app on their device. Developers can build beta tester groups directly using the App Store and Xcode integration and publicize these invitation links.

After invitation, up to 25 internal testers (with up to 10 devices each) and 10,000 external beta testers can download and test the application build. Up to 100 apps can be tested at a time, internally or externally. Testers may be grouped and separate builds created for each group. The TestFlight application for iOS notifies testers when new builds are available, features to focus on, and enables sending of feedback.

History 
TestFlight was founded by Benjamin Satterfield and Trystan Kosmynka on December 23, 2010, and was designed as a single platform to test mobile applications on Android and iOS devices. It was  acquired by Burstly in March 2012, and thereby gained the resources necessary to launch TestFlight Live.

In 2011, Burstly raised $7.3 million from Upfront Ventures, Rincon Venture Partners, Softbank Capital and others. Apple Inc. acquired Burstly in February 2014, and terminated support for Android as of March 2014. Apple also shut down FlightPath (a mobile analytics solution and a replacement to TestFlight Live) and SkyRocket (a mobile application monetization platform) the same month.

References

See also
 iOS

Apple Inc. services
iOS software
Apple Inc. acquisitions
Defunct software companies of the United States